The 89th Illinois Infantry Regiment, nicknamed the Railroad Regiment, was an infantry regiment that served from August 27, 1862, to June 24, 1865 in the Union Army during the American Civil War.

Service
The 89th Illinois Infantry was organized at Chicago, Illinois and mustered into federal service on August 27, 1862. The regiment was nicknamed the "Railroad Regiment" due to the important role Chicago-based railroad companies had in raising and filing the regiment's roster. The regiment's motto, "Clear the Tracks" was stitched onto the national flag.

It participated in the battles of Stones River, Liberty Gap, Chickamauga, Orchard Knob and Missionary Ridge, Pickett's Mill, the Atlanta Campaign, and Nashville. Its brigade commander for most of the American Civil War was August Willich- regimental commander for most of the war was Charles Truman Hotchkiss. Major John M. Farquhar- then sergeant major- was awarded the Medal of Honor for heroic service at the Battle of Stones River. The regiment was mustered out on June 10, 1865, and discharged at Chicago on June 24, 1865.

Total strength and casualties 
12 officers and 121 enlisted men were killed in action or died of their wounds, and 1 officer and 172 enlisted men died of disease, for a total of 306 fatalities.

See also
Horn Brigade

List of Illinois Civil War Units

References

Bibliography 
 Dyer, Frederick H. (1959). A Compendium of the War of the Rebellion. New York and London. Thomas Yoseloff, Publisher. .

Units and formations of the Union Army from Illinois
1862 establishments in Illinois
Military units and formations established in 1862
Military units and formations disestablished in 1865